"This Heartache Never Sleeps" is a song written by Tim Johnson and Daryl Burgess, and recorded by American country music artist Mark Chesnutt. It was released in April 1999 as the second single from the album I Don't Want to Miss a Thing. The song reached number 17 on the Billboard Hot Country Singles & Tracks chart and peaked at number 10 on the Canadian RPM Country Tracks chart.

Chart performance
"This Heartache Never Sleeps" debuted at number 75 on the U.S. Billboard Hot Country Singles & Tracks for the week of April 24, 1999.

Year-end charts

References

Songs about heartache
1999 singles
1998 songs
Mark Chesnutt songs
Decca Records singles
Songs written by Tim Johnson (songwriter)
Song recordings produced by Mark Wright (record producer)